Paris is a 2003 American thriller film written and directed by Ramin Niami. Original music for this film was composed by John Cale, who had previously worked with Niami on his 1998 film Somewhere in the City.

Cast 
Chad Allen as Jason Bartok
Bai Ling as Linda / Shen Li
James Russo as Leon King
Irene Bedard as Sandy
James Lew as Mr. Fue
Karen Black as Chantelle
Ron Jeremy as Bartender
Biff Yeager as Bill Baker
Valarie Pettiford as Terry
François Chau as Mr. Kim
Nancye Ferguson as Brenda
Belinda Waymouth as Tina
Jeni Chua as Mieko
E.J. Callahan as Motel Owner
John Snyder as Car Salesman
Masasa Moyo as Bartender
Karen Robson as Receptionist
Terry Camilleri as Poker Player
Ramin Niami as Gunman
Jason David Frank as Chad

External links

 

2003 films
American comedy thriller films
Films scored by John Cale
2000s comedy thriller films
Films directed by Ramin Niami
2000s English-language films
2000s American films